Ashcroft is a suburb of Sydney, in the state of New South Wales, Australia 35 kilometres south-west of the Sydney central business district, in the local government area of the City of Liverpool.

History
The suburb was formed as part of the Housing Commission's Green Valley development. It was named Ashcroft after the pioneering family in the district that gave the land for the site of this development. The Ashcroft family was active in establishing meat wholesaling and retailing activities at the Homebush Bay abattoir. E.J. Ashcroft was a butcher at Liverpool in the 1890s. Although named earlier, Ashcroft was officially gazetted on 7 April 1972. Ashcroft Post Office opened on 3 May 1965 and closed in 1985.

Demographics
According to the 2016 census, there were 3,585 people in Ashcroft.
 Aboriginal and Torres Strait Islander people made up 4.5% of the population. 
 53.4% of people were born in Australia. The next most common countries of birth were Vietnam 7.0%, Lebanon 5.5% and Iraq 3.5%.   
 39.5% of people only spoke English at home. Other languages spoken at home included Arabic 19.2% and Vietnamese 10.7%. 
 The most common responses for religion were Islam 20.6% and Catholic 19.5%.

Notable residents

Mark Latham, former leader of the Australian Labor Party.
 Joseph Gatehau, finalist on the 2006 series of Australian Idol.
 X-Factor finalists Mahogany (9th contestants eliminated) attended Ashcroft High School.
 Brad Fittler – a Rugby league great, a former Ashcroft resident and also attended Ashcroft High School.
 Jason Taylor – former professional rugby league footballer and former coach of the South Sydney Rabbitohs, a former Ashcroft resident and also attended Ashcroft High School.
 Ben Te'o – Rugby league player with South Sydney Rabbitohs attended Ashcroft High School.
Junior Paulo – Rugby League player for Canberra Raiders attended Ashcroft High School.

Notable events
Ashcroft High School were the first co-educational school to win the Amco Shield (now called the Arrive Alive Cup). They won the Amco Shield in 1977 and again in 1985. In 1976, Ashcroft became the first city school to win the University Shield for 31 years and went on to win it again in 1977, 1984 and 1985. They were also Amco Shield runner up in 1976 and University Shield runner up in 1978. Ashcroft High also won the Buckley Shield in 1982 and 1987. Ashcroft Primary School also won the Westmont Shield, year unknown. Ashcroft is the only suburb that has one all major schoolboys rugby league competitions, Amco Shield, University Shield, Buckley Shield and Westmont Shield along with numerous Parramatta and state knockouts. Also in 1977 Ashcroft High played the curtain-raiser to the Grand Final replay between Parramatta and St George. They were narrowly beaten by the NSW CHS team.

Notable landmarks 
The small Ashcroft side corner shop which contains a food takeaway shop, a hairdresser's and a doctors surgery also boasts a mural on the side of the building on Carpenter Lane. The mural depicts a waterfall flowing into the ocean and a forest with a tropical bird and frog in the trees.

Sport and recreation
A number of well-known sporting teams represent the local area. One of them is the rugby league club All Saints Liverpool.

References

The Book of Sydney Suburbs, Compiled by Frances Pollen, Angus & Robertson Publishers, 1990, Published in Australia 

Suburbs of Sydney
City of Liverpool (New South Wales)